Scarborough Beach Bus Station in Western Australia is a Transperth bus station located at the west end of Scarborough Beach Road in Scarborough. It has four stands and is served by 4 Transperth routes operated by Swan Transit.

The bus station provides the bus services in Doubleview and Woodlands, and connects to Stirling and Glendalough Station, both part of the Joondalup Line. The bus station opened on 25 June 2017.

Bus routes

Gallery

References

Bus stations in Perth, Western Australia